The 2005–06 Dallas Mavericks season was the 26th season of the franchise in the National Basketball Association (NBA). The season saw Dallas go to the NBA Finals for the first time in franchise history, but lost to the Miami Heat, who were led by Shaquille O'Neal and Dwyane Wade, in six games. Dallas and Miami met again in the 2011 NBA Finals, where the Mavericks avenged the loss and defeated the favored Heat in six games to win their first NBA championship. Teammates Dirk Nowitzki and Jason Terry were the only members of both 2006 and 2011 Finals teams.

In the playoffs, the Mavericks defeated the Memphis Grizzlies in the first round. In the Western Conference semifinals, they met the San Antonio Spurs once again in the playoffs for the first time since the 2003 Western Conference Finals, and defeated the Spurs in seven games. They got to Conference Finals once again for the first time since 2003, where they beat the Phoenix Suns in six games and won their first conference title in franchise history. In the NBA Finals, they faced the Miami Heat but lost to them in six games.

Starting the season, the Mavericks started with a 35–10 record as Dirk Nowitzki was selected for the 2006 NBA All-Star Game in Houston. The Mavericks finished with a 60–22 record overall and second place in the Southwest Division. Head coach Avery Johnson was named Coach of The Year. Following the season, Keith Van Horn retired.

Offseason

Draft picks

The Mavericks did not have any selections in the 2005 NBA Draft.

Roster

Regular season

Standings

Division

Conference

Record vs. opponents

Game log

Playoffs

|- align="center" bgcolor="#ccffcc"
| 1
| April 23
| Memphis
| W 103–93
| Dirk Nowitzki (31)
| Erick Dampier (12)
| Jason Terry (4)
| American Airlines Center20,340
| 1–0
|- align="center" bgcolor="#ccffcc"
| 2
| April 26
| Memphis
| W 94–79
| Dirk Nowitzki (31)
| three players tied (6)
| Jason Terry (9)
| American Airlines Center20,612
| 2–0
|- align="center" bgcolor="#ccffcc"
| 3
| April 29
| @ Memphis
| W 94–89 (OT)
| Dirk Nowitzki (36)
| three players tied (9)
| Dirk Nowitzki (5)
| FedExForum17,871
| 3–0
|- align="center" bgcolor="#ccffcc"
| 4
| May 1
| @ Memphis
| W 102–76
| Dirk Nowitzki (27)
| Josh Howard (9)
| Stackhouse, Terry (5)
| FedExForum15,104
| 4–0
|-

|- align="center" bgcolor="#ffcccc"
| 1
| May 7
| @ San Antonio
| L 85–87
| Jerry Stackhouse (24)
| Dirk Nowitzki (14)
| Marquis Daniels (3)
| AT&T Center18,797
| 0–1
|- align="center" bgcolor="#ccffcc"
| 2
| May 9
| @ San Antonio
| W 113–91
| Josh Howard (27)
| Howard, Nowitzki (9)
| three players tied (3)
| AT&T Center18,797
| 1–1
|- align="center" bgcolor="#ccffcc"
| 3
| May 13
| San Antonio
| W 104–103
| Dirk Nowitzki (27)
| Dirk Nowitzki (15)
| Jason Terry (4)
| American Airlines Center20,865
| 2–1
|- align="center" bgcolor="#ccffcc"
| 4
| May 15
| San Antonio
| W 123–118 (OT)
| Jason Terry (32)
| Dampier, Nowitzki (9)
| Devin Harris (6)
| American Airlines Center20,969
| 3–1
|- align="center" bgcolor="#ffcccc"
| 5
| May 17
| @ San Antonio
| L 97–98
| Dirk Nowitzki (31)
| Dirk Nowitzki (12)
| Jason Terry (5)
| AT&T Center18,797
| 3–2
|- align="center" bgcolor="#ffcccc"
| 6
| May 19
| San Antonio
| L 86–91
| Dirk Nowitzki (26)
| Dirk Nowitzki (21)
| Dirk Nowitzki (5)
| American Airlines Center20,986
| 3–3
|- align="center" bgcolor="#ccffcc"
| 7
| May 22
| @ San Antonio
| W 119–111 (OT)
| Dirk Nowitzki (37)
| Dirk Nowitzki (15)
| Jerry Stackhouse (6)
| AT&T Center
| 4–3
|-

|- align="center" bgcolor="#ffcccc"
| 1
| May 24
| Phoenix
| L 118–121
| Devin Harris (30)
| Dirk Nowitzki (19)
| Terry, Stackhouse (3)
| American Airlines Center20,789
| 0–1
|- align="center" bgcolor="#ccffcc"
| 2
| May 26
| Phoenix
| W 105–98
| Dirk Nowitzki (30)
| Dirk Nowitzki (14)
| Dirk Nowitzki (6)
| American Airlines Center20,934
| 1–1
|- align="center" bgcolor="#ccffcc"
| 3
| May 28
| @ Phoenix
| W 95–88
| Dirk Nowitzki (28)
| Dirk Nowitzki (17)
| Dirk Nowitzki (5)
| US Airways Center18,422
| 2–1
|- align="center" bgcolor="#ffcccc"
| 4
| May 30
| @ Phoenix
| L 86–106
| Josh Howard (16)
| Josh Howard (9)
| Devin Harris (5)
| US Airways Center18,422
| 2–2
|- align="center" bgcolor="#ccffcc"
| 5
| June 1
| Phoenix
| W 117–101
| Dirk Nowitzki (50)
| Dirk Nowitzki (12)
| Jason Terry (9)
| American Airlines Center20,977
| 3–2
|- align="center" bgcolor="#ccffcc"
| 6
| June 3
| @ Phoenix
| W 102–93
| Dirk Nowitzki (24)
| Josh Howard (15)
| Nowitzki, Terry (3)
| US Airways Center18,422
| 4–2
|-

|- align="center" bgcolor="#ccffcc"
| 1
| June 8
| Miami
| W 90–80
| Jason Terry (32)
| Josh Howard (12)
| three players tied (4)
| American Airlines Center20,475
| 1–0
|- align="center" bgcolor="#ccffcc"
| 2
| June 10
| Miami
| W 99–85
| Dirk Nowitzki (26)
| Dirk Nowitzki (16)
| Jason Terry (9)
| American Airlines Center20,459
| 2–0
|- align="center" bgcolor="#ffcccc"
| 3
| June 13
| @ Miami
| L 96–98
| Dirk Nowitzki (30)
| Erick Dampier (9)
| Jason Terry (5)
| American Airlines Arena20,145
| 2–1
|- align="center" bgcolor="#ffcccc"
| 4
| June 15
| @ Miami
| L 74–98
| Jason Terry (17)
| Dirk Nowitzki (9)
| Jerry Stackhouse (4)
| American Airlines Arena20,145
| 2–2
|- align="center" bgcolor="#ffcccc"
| 5
| June 18
| @ Miami
| L 100–101 (OT)
| Jason Terry (35)
| Josh Howard (10)
| Marquis Daniels (4)
| American Airlines Arena20,145
| 2–3
|- align="center" bgcolor="#ffcccc"
| 6
| June 20
| Miami
| L 92–95
| Dirk Nowitzki (29)
| Dirk Nowitzki (15)
| Jason Terry (5)
| American Airlines Center20,522
| 2–4
|-

Player statistics

Season

Playoffs

Awards and records

Awards
 Avery Johnson, NBA Coach of the Year Award
 Dirk Nowitzki, All-NBA First Team
 Dirk Nowitzki, NBA All-Star Game
 Dirk Nowitzki,  NBA All-Star Weekend Three Point Shootout Champion

Records

Transactions

Trades

Free Agents

Additions

Subtractions

See also
 2005–06 NBA season

References

Dallas Mavericks seasons
Western Conference (NBA) championship seasons
Dallas
Dallas